A Kiel probe is a device for measuring stagnation pressure or stagnation temperature in fluid dynamics. It is a variation of a Pitot probe where the inlet is protected by a "shroud" or "shield." Compared to the Pitot probe, it is less sensitive to changes in yaw angle, and is therefore useful when the probe's alignment with the flow direction is variable or imprecise.

References 

Pressure gauges